Nitya is a given name. Notable people with the name include:

Hinduism
 Nitya, a category of being used in the logical framework of Vedanta
 Nitya-samsarins, as classified by Shri Madhvacharya, are souls which are eternally transmigrating
 Nitya karma, a set of Hindu rituals
 Nitya, The opposite of impermanence
 Nitya, The opposite of ephemerality
 Eternity
 Immortality

Organizations
Kavre Nitya Chandeswor, village development committee in Kavrepalanchok District in the Bagmati Zone of central Nepal
Nitya Seva, association which supports disadvantaged sections of society

People with given name
Nitya Anand (born 1925), scientist, director of Central Drug Research Institute in Lucknow
Nitya Chaitanya Yati (1923–1999), Indian philosopher
Nitya Krishinda Maheswari (born 1988), former Indonesian badminton player
Nitya Pibulsonggram (1941–2014), Thai career diplomat and politician
Nitya Nand Reddy (born 1950), Fiji Indian, accountant and unionist, before being elected to the House of Representatives of Fiji
Nitya Vidyasagar, Indian-American actress and former Sesame Street cast member
Nitya Mehra, Indian film director and screenwriter
Nitya Shetty, Indian actress of Telugu and Tamil films

See also
Nithya (disambiguation)